is the 10th cover album by Japanese entertainer Akina Nakamori, released on November 8, 2017 under Universal Music Japan.

Background
Cage was released as a part of the 35th debut anniversary celebration and on the same day as the original album Akina.

The album was released in the limited and regular edition. The limited edition includes a DVD containing 10 minutes of footage for Nakamori's 35th debut anniversary celebration.

After the album's release, Nakamori's music release activities were suspended without announcement.

Chart performance
Cage debuted at No. 8 on Oricon's albums chart and charted for six weeks. On the Billboard Japan charts, the album debuted at No. 7 on the Album Weekly Charts.

Track listing
All tracks arranged by Kengo Sasaki.

Charts

Footnotes

References

External links
 
 
 

2017 albums
Akina Nakamori albums
Japanese-language albums
English-language Japanese albums
Covers albums
Universal Music Japan albums